Amore is the first and only album by Alessandra Mussolini. The album was released by the Alfa Records in 1982 in Japan only and was produced by Miki Curtis. On the album, Mussolini sang songs in Italian, English and Japanese. In 1982, Mussolini and her mother paid a visit to Japan. When asked if her daughter can sing for an advertisement, Mussolini's mother gave a positive answer, even though Mussolini had never sung before. Mussolini recalled that, "When I sang in Japan, Cristiano Malgioglio (author of some of her songs on the album) saved me." The album was broadcast in Italy for the first time in a program of Canale 5 in 1996.

In 2000, an album was sold in London for 10 million Lire. In 2021, during an interview with Canale 5, Mussolini performed the song "Tokyo Fantasy" from the album in Japanese.

Track listing

Side 1:
 "Tokyo Fantasy" - 3:42
 "Carta vincente" - 3:53
 "Amai Kiouku" (甘い記憶) - 4:50
 "Insieme insieme" - 4:00

Side 2:
 "Love Is Love" - 4:01
 "E stasera mi manchi" - 3:34
 "Tears" - 3:54
 "L'ultima notte d'amore" - 3:19

References

External links
 Amore at Discogs
Posters within the Album

1982 albums
Italian-language albums
Japanese-language albums